The sulphur-rumped tanager (Heterospingus rubrifrons) is a species of bird in the family Thraupidae.
It is found in Costa Rica and Panama.
Its natural habitat is subtropical or tropical moist lowland forests.

References

sulphur-rumped tanager
Birds of Costa Rica
Birds of Panama
sulphur-rumped tanager
Taxonomy articles created by Polbot